Lawrence Eric Taylor (born April 1, 1942) is an American attorney and author. A graduate of the University of California, Berkeley and UCLA School of Law, Taylor was a public defender and criminal prosecutor in Los Angeles County before entering private practice. He currently heads a law firm in California that limits its practice to drunk driving defense.  Both Taylor and his law firm are ranked "A-V" ("very high to pre-eminent in legal ability and ethics") by the Martindale-Hubbell International Law Directory.  Taylor and his law firm have also been recognized by Super Lawyers magazine for the years 2004 through 2012 as being among the top 5 percent of DUI defense attorneys.

Taylor served in the United States Marine Corps from 1961 to 1964.

He served as a Deputy District Attorney for Los Angeles County from 1970 to 1971 and as a Deputy Public Defender from 1971 to 1972.

In the case of the People v. Charles Manson, Taylor was the trial court's legal advisor.  He was also counsel to the California Supreme Court in the Onion Field murder case, and an independent Special Prosecutor retained by the Attorney General of Montana to conduct a one-year grand jury probe of government corruption from 1975 to 1976. Taylor was voted "professor of the year" during his tenure at Gonzaga University School of Law in Spokane, Washington from 1982 to 1985. He was also a Fulbright Professor of Law at Osaka University in Japan in 1985 and a visiting professor at Pepperdine University School of Law.

He founded and served as dean of the National College for DUI Defense from 1995 to 1996. He has lectured at over 200 lawyers' seminars in 38 states. He is the author of 12 books, including the well-known textbook on the subject of DUI, now in its seventh edition. On July 25, 2002, Taylor was presented with the NCDD's "Lifetime Achievement Award" at Harvard Law School.

Books
Drunk Driving Defense 7th Edition. (Wolters Kluwer Law & Business/Aspen Publishers )(Co-authored with Steven Oberman beginning with the 5th edition)
Born to Crime (Greenwood Press )
California Drunk Driving Defense, 3rd Edition (West )
The D.A.: A True Story (William Morrow )
Eyewitness Identification (Michie )
Handling Criminal Appeals (West )
Scientific Interrogation (Michie )
Setting Sail (Icarus )
To Honor and Obey (William Morrow )
Trail of the Fox (Simon and Schuster )
A Trial of Generals (Icarus )
Witness Immunity (Charles C.Thomas )

References

External links
The Law Offices of Lawrence Taylor
Lawrence Taylor's DUI Blog
Author Lawrence Taylor

1942 births
Living people
American non-fiction writers
California lawyers
Driving under the influence
United States Marines
Gonzaga University
People from Los Angeles
University of California, Berkeley alumni
UCLA School of Law alumni
Public defenders